Carl Edward Dillery (December 17, 1930 Seattle, Washington - January 23, 2016) was the U.S. ambassador to Fiji, Tonga, Tuvalu and Kiribati (formerly known as the Gilbert Islands) (1984 to 1987) and chair of the American Foreign Service Association’s (AFSA) Scholarship Committee for 15 years (1997 to 2012) and retiree vice president from 1991 to 1993.

Dillery graduated from Seattle Pacific College in 1953 with a bachelor's degree in history and earn a master's of science degree in the administration of national security from The George Washington University. After Seattle Pacific, he worked as an insurance examiner before joining the Foreign Service in 1955.

References

External links
The Association for Diplomatic Studies and Training Foreign Affairs Oral History Project AMBASSADOR CARL EDWARD DILLERY

Ambassadors of the United States to Fiji
Ambassadors of the United States to Tonga
Ambassadors of the United States to Kiribati
Ambassadors of the United States to Tuvalu
People from Seattle
Seattle Pacific University alumni
George Washington University alumni
1930 births
2016 deaths
20th-century American diplomats